The 1895 Currie Cup was the third edition of the Currie Cup, the premier domestic rugby union competition in South Africa.

See also

 Currie Cup

References

1895
1895 in South African rugby union
Currie